The MTV Video Music Award for Best Video Game Soundtrack was awarded from 2004 to 2006 as an attempt by MTV to tap into the video gaming community in order to gain greater audiences for its VMAs.  When the MTV Video Music Awards were revamped in 2007, this award was eliminated and never brought back.

Recipients

MTV Video Music Awards
Awards established in 2004
Awards disestablished in 2006